In music, Op. 136 stands for Opus number 136. Compositions that are assigned this number include:

 Beethoven – Der glorreiche Augenblick
 Schumann – Hermann und Dorothea
 Shostakovich – Loyalty